The Mankato — North Mankato Metropolitan Statistical Area, as defined by the United States Census Bureau, is an area consisting of two counties in south central Minnesota, anchored by the cities of Mankato and North Mankato.  It was upgraded from a Micropolitan Statistical Area (μSA) to a Metropolitan Statistical Area (MSA) by the Office of Management and Budget on November 20, 2008. As of the 2020 census, the μSA (now MSA) had a population of 103,566.

Counties
Blue Earth
Nicollet

Communities

Places with more than 40,000 inhabitants
Mankato (Principal city; partial)

Places with 10,000 to 20,000 inhabitants
North Mankato (Principal city)
St. Peter

Places with 1,000 to 10,000 inhabitants
Eagle Lake
Lake Crystal
Madison Lake
Mapleton
Nicollet

Places with 500 to 1,000 inhabitants
Amboy
Courtland
Lafayette
Minnesota Lake (partial)
St. Clair
Good Thunder

Places with less than 500 inhabitants
Pemberton
Skyline
Vernon Center

Unincorporated places
Garden City
Klossner
Norseland
St. George

Townships

Blue Earth County

Nicollet County

Demographics

As of the 2000 census, there were 85,712 people, 31,704 households, and 19,927 families residing within the μSA (now MSA). The racial makeup of the μSA (now MSA) was 95.45% White, 1.06% African American, 0.27% Native American, 1.56% Asian, 0.05% Pacific Islander, 0.68% from other races, and 0.93% from two or more races. Hispanic or Latino of any race were 1.73% of the population.

The median income for a household in the μSA (now MSA) was $42,555, and the median income for a family was $52,976. Males had a median income of $34,162 versus $23,936 for females. The per capita income for the μSA (now MSA) was $19,615.

See also
Minnesota census statistical areas

References

 
Metropolitan areas of Minnesota